Jessy W. Grizzle is an American engineer and Elmer G. Gilbert Distinguished University Professor of Engineering at the University of Michigan. He is also the Jerry W. and Carol L. Levin Professor of Engineering.

References 

American engineers
University of Michigan faculty
Living people
Year of birth missing (living people)